We're No Angels is a 1955 Christmas comedy film directed by Michael Curtiz, starring Humphrey Bogart, Peter Ustinov, Aldo Ray, Joan Bennett, Basil Rathbone, Leo G. Carroll, and Gloria Talbott. Shot in both  VistaVision and Technicolor, the film was a Paramount Pictures release.

The screenplay was written by Ranald MacDougall, based on the play My Three Angels by Samuel and Bella Spewack, which itself was based upon the French play La Cuisine Des Anges by Albert Husson. Mary Grant designed the film's costumes.

The film is set on Christmas Eve and Christmas Day, 1895.

Plot
Three convicts – Joseph, Albert and Jules – escape from prison on Devil's Island in French Guiana just before Christmas and arrive at the nearby French colonial town of Cayenne on Christmas Eve. Joseph is a thief; the other two are murderers.

They go to a store managed by Felix Ducotel. The store is in a very poor financial position as it is the only one to give supplies on credit. While there, they notice its roof is leaking, and offer to fix it for nothing. They get involved in selling things in the shop and have a knack for it, selling a brush set to a bald man, and getting the first cash income in a long time. They offer to make Christmas dinner for the family and the meal is very successful.

They do not actually intend to, but decide to remain there until nightfall, when they will steal clothes and supplies and escape on a ship waiting in the harbor. As they wait, they find that the small family of Felix, Amelie, and daughter Isabelle, is in financial distress and offer their services to hide the trio's all-too-sinister ruse. Joseph even gets to work conning people and falsifying records to make the store prosperous.  However, the three felons begin to have a change of heart after they fix a delicious Christmas dinner for the Ducotels made mostly of stolen items.

Tensions heighten after store owner Andre Trochard arrives from Paris with his nephew Paul, with a set of crocodile skin luggage. The Trochards plan on taking over the store, which they perceive is unprofitable due to its use of credit. Isabelle had planned to wed Paul but it turns out that Paul is betrothed to another woman, to Isabelle's dismay.  Before any action can be taken, both men are bitten by Albert's pet viper, Adolphe, and die. Adolphe disappears and the three have to search for him.

Isabelle finds another love, and the family is happy as the convicts finally ready for their postponed escape.  However, while waiting on the docks for their boat to arrive, the threesome reconsiders.  Judging that the outside world is likely to be worse than that of the prison, they decide to turn themselves back in.  As they walk toward it at film's end halos appear over their heads...followed by one above the cage of Adolphe.

Cast
Humphrey Bogart as Joseph
Aldo Ray as Albert
Peter Ustinov as Jules
Joan Bennett as Amelie Ducotel
Basil Rathbone as Andre Trochard
Leo G. Carroll as Felix Ducotel
Gloria Talbott as Isabelle Ducotel
John Baer as Paul Trochard
Lea Penman as Madame Parole, customer
John Smith as Medical Officer Arnaud
Torben Meyer as Butterfly Man (uncredited)
Paul Newlan as Port Captain (uncredited)

Reception 
The film gained mixed reviews. Howard Thompson, critic for the New York Times, was underwhelmed, calling it a "shrill, misguided picture" and writing that the filmic version was not on par with the Broadway version. Variety found few faults in the "breezy comedy" but claimed that among its faults was its inability to utilize a more cinematic blocking: "At times proceedings are too consciously cute and stage origin of material still clings since virtually all scenes are interiors with characters constantly entering and exiting." Jack Moffit of The Hollywood Reporter had a favorable review of the film, calling it "a glamorous comedy" full of performances which "are uniformly excellent" and a screenplay which "is worthy of study." Likewise, Lionel Collier of Picturegoer praised it as "a real breakaway comedy--ghoulish humor with a neat sardonic kick."

We're No Angels grossed $3 million in the box office. In 1955, it was the 34th highest-grossing film in the U.S./Canada market.

Legacy
Joan Bennett's Christmas Eve song "Sentimental Moments" by Friedrich Hollander and Ralph Freed was recorded for the first time by Eric Clapton for his 2018 Christmas album, "Happy Xmas". In 1989, Neil Jordan directed a remake of We're No Angels starring Robert De Niro, Sean Penn, and Demi Moore where the escaped convicts are mistaken for a pair of priests at a local monastery in upstate New York.

See also
List of American films of 1955
 List of Christmas films

References

External links

1950s Christmas comedy films
1950s Christmas films
1950s English-language films
1950s crime comedy films
1950s prison films
1955 films
1955 comedy films
American Christmas comedy films
American crime comedy films
American films based on plays
American prison films
Films directed by Michael Curtiz
Films scored by Friedrich Hollaender
Films set on Devil's Island
Films with screenplays by Ranald MacDougall
Paramount Pictures films
Religious comedy films
1950s American films